Maurice Apeang (born 7 September 1951) is a French boxer. He competed in the men's featherweight event at the 1972 Summer Olympics. At the 1972 Summer Olympics, he lost to Louis Self of the United States.

References

1951 births
Living people
French male boxers
Olympic boxers of France
Boxers at the 1972 Summer Olympics
People from Tahiti
Featherweight boxers